The 9th Lo Nuestro Awards ceremony, presented by Univision honoring the best Latin music of 1996 and 1997 took place on May 8, 1997, at a live presentation held at the James L. Knight Center in Miami, Florida. The ceremony was broadcast in United States and Latin America by Univision.

During the ceremony, nineteen categories were presented. Winners were announced at the live event and included Spanish singer Enrique Iglesias receiving three awards, and Colombian singer Shakira, Mexican group Límite, Dominican band Ilegales, each receiving two awards. Among its honors, Iglesias won the award for "Pop Album of the Year," Los Tigres del Norte earned  the award for "Regional Mexican Album of the Year," and Marc Anthony won the award for "Tropical/Salsa Album of the Year." Mexican group Mariachi Vargas de Tecalitlán received the Excellence Award and a special tribute was given to singer-songwriter Juan Gabriel.

Background 
In 1989, the Lo Nuestro Awards were established by Univision, to recognize the most talented performers of Latin music. The nominees and winners were selected by a voting poll conducted among program directors of Spanish-language radio stations in the United States. The categories included are for the Pop, Tropical/Salsa, Regional Mexican and Music Video. The trophy awarded is shaped like a treble clef. The 9th Lo Nuestro Awards ceremony was held on May 8, 1997, in a live presentation held at the James L. Knight Center in Miami, Florida. The ceremony was broadcast in United States and Latin America by Univision.

Winners and nominees 

Winners were announced before the live audience during the ceremony. Mexican singer-songwriter Marco Antonio Solís was the most nominated performer, with five nominations which resulted in one win for "Regional Mexican Male Artist of the Year"; the rest of Solís' nominations were awarded to Spanish singer Enrique Iglesias ("Pop Album of the Year", "Pop Male Artist of the Year", and "Pop Song of the Year"). Iglesias was awarded "Pop Song of the Year" and "Pop Album of the Year" the year before with his debut album and with "Si Tu Te Vas", respectively. Colombian singer Shakira, the most nominated female performer with five nominations, received two awards: "Pop Female Artist" and "Pop New Artist". Three songs nominated for Pop Song of the Year reached number-one at the Billboard Top Latin Songs chart (both Iglesias "Experiencia Religiosa" and "Por Amarte", and "¡Basta Ya!" by Puerto-Rican singer Olga Tañón). Italian performer Eros Ramazzotti earned the accolade for Best Music Video for "La Aurora".

Dominican band Ilegales and American singer Marc Anthony dominated the Tropical/Salsa field earning two awards each, Ilegales won for "Song of the Year" with "La Morena" and "Group of the Year"; while Anthony received "Album of the Year" and "Male Singer of the Year". In the Regional Mexican field, Límite received two awards, while performers Grupo Mojado, Los Tigres del Norte, and Ana Bárbara each earned one accolade.

Honorary awards 
Excellence Award: Mariachi Vargas de Tecalitlán.
Special Tribute: Juan Gabriel.

See also 
1996 in Latin music
1997 in Latin music
Grammy Award for Best Latin Pop Album

References 

1997 music awards
Lo Nuestro Awards by year
1997 in Florida
1997 in Latin music
1990s in Miami